eTopps is a type of trading card originally launched by the Topps company in 2000.

Each week a limited number of sports cards, called IPOs, are offered for sale exclusively through Etopps.com. This method of distribution contrasts with the traditional sale of sports cards through packs at retail stores. Collectors are then allocated a number of cards based on the number of orders for each particular card.

Card owners can then hold their cards in an online portfolio, while Topps retains physical possession of their cards in a climate-controlled warehouse in Delaware. If collectors would rather take delivery of their cards, eTopps will ship them the cards for a fee. Card values are tracked from actual sales on the eBay trading floor, giving each collector an up-to-the-minute portfolio value. This facet of the program has attracted investors in addition to sports card collectors.

On January 9, 2012, Topps announced on the eTopps.com webpage it would no longer be selling new IPOs, though would continue trading, selling, and shipping existing eTopps cards.  In total, 2,974 unique eTopps cards were issued, with a total print run of 3,986,192.

As of 2021, the eTopps website is barely maintained, however the trading floor is still active.

Card values have rebounded somewhat, although shipping costs would make taking most cards in hand impractical. For many cards, the cost to have the cards delivered would be several times higher than the value of the card itself.

See also

References

External links
eTopps

Trading cards